The 6th Golden Eagle Awards were held June 12, 1988, in Shenyang, Liaoning province.  Nominees and winners are listed below, winners are in bold.

Best Television Series
not awarded this year
Journey to the West/西游记
Snow City/雪城
Plainclothes Policeman/便衣警察

Best Mini-series
not awarded this year
Army Soul/军魂
Larceny of Animal Kingdom/动物王国窃案

Best Lead Actor in a Television Series
Liu Xiao Ling Tong for Journey to the West

Best Lead Actress in a Television Series
Ma Lan for Yan Fengying

Best Supporting Actor in a Television Series
Shen Junyi for Wu Long Shan Jiao Fei Ji

Best Supporting Actress in a Television Series
Ni Ping for Snow City

References

External links

1988
1988 in Chinese television
Mass media in Shenyang